They All Come Out is a 1939 American crime film directed by Jacques Tourneur, written by John C. Higgins, and starring Rita Johnson, Tom Neal, Bernard Nedell, Edward Gargan, John Gallaudet and Addison Richards. It was released on August 4, 1939, by Metro-Goldwyn-Mayer.

Plot
The film opens in a documentary style with narration and the introduction of two government officials associated with the prison system, as themselves, talking across a desk in an office setting.  The story is then presented as being based on events in the lives of many prisoners.

Kitty is involved with a gang planning a bank robbery when she meets and helps down-and-out Joe in a diner.  Joe can't pay for what has been his first meal in three days, and has been unable to find work due to a broken wrist that was never set. Kitty recommends him for the bank robbery when a driver is needed.  With the gang on the run from the law after the robbery, Kitty is shot and Joe saves her from being left behind. Eventually, the entire gang is captured.

The benevolent, compassionate, and highly effective prison system of 1939 offers help and understanding to all of the gang members, but only some- including Kitty and Joe- are willing to put their lives back on the right path. The prison doctor operates successfully on Joe's wrist and Kitty is allowed to correspond with Joe.  After being paroled, both Kitty and Joe are immediately accepted and trusted in new jobs on the outside, but face challenges when another criminal attempts to draw them back into trouble.

Cast 
 Rita Johnson as Kitty
 Tom Neal as Joe Z. Cameron
 Bernard Nedell as Clyde "Reno" Madigan 
 Edward Gargan as George Jacklin 
 John Gallaudet as Albert Crane
 Addison Richards as Warden 
 Frank M. Thomas as Superintendent
 George Tobias as 'Sloppy Joe'
 Ann Shoemaker as Dr. Ellen Hollis
 Charles Lane as Psychiatrist
 Adrian Morris as Judge in Kangaroo Court

References

External links 
 
 
 
 

1939 films
1939 crime drama films
1930s prison films
American black-and-white films
American crime drama films
American prison drama films
1930s English-language films
Films directed by Jacques Tourneur
Metro-Goldwyn-Mayer films
Films scored by Edward Ward (composer)
1930s American films